Robert Joseph Bandoni (11 November 1926 – 5 May 2009) was a mycologist who specialized on the taxonomy and morphology of the heterobasidiomycetes (“jelly fungi”).

During his 50 years as professor at the University of British Columbia, he wrote over 80 scientific publications as well as several books. He was awarded the title of Professor Emeritus in 1989. In 1990 the Canadian Botanical Association awarded him the George Lawson Medal. Bandoni died on May 18, 2009, in Vancouver, British Columbia, after suffering a stroke.

Biography 
Robert "Bob" Joseph Bandoni was born November 9, 1926, in Weeks, Nevada to Giuseppe and Albina Bandoni.  He went to high school in Hawthorne, Nevada and received a Bachelor of Science from the University of Nevada in 1953. He then studied under George Willard Martin at the University of Iowa and received his Ph.D. in 1957. The title of his thesis was: "Taxonomic studies of the genus Tremella (Tremellaceae). That same year, he received the Gertrude S. Burlingham Fellowship at the New York Botanical Garden and became assistant professor of Botany at the University of Wichita. In 1958 Bandoni joined the Botany faculty at the University of British Columbia (UBC). He helped found the Vancouver Mycological Society in the 1970s. He was awarded the status of professor emeritus in 1989. Bandoni died on May 18, 2009 from a stroke.

Mycological and botanical contributions 
Bandoni mainly studied the heterobasidiomycetes, commonly known as the "Jelly Fungi". His early publications were of a classical taxonomical nature, writing descriptions of the macro- and micro-morphology via the light microscope. In the early 1970s Bandoni started studying aquatic fungi that occur in terrestrial environments. He published a paper in the journal Science that explained how spores can travel upwards on a monolayer of water on a leaf surface. In the 1980s Bandoni collaborated with Franz Oberwinkler and colleagues at the University of Tübingen to produce over 20 papers on the Jelly Fungi and allies. They described new species, genera, families and orders. They used TEM and SEM micrographs to investigate the significance of septal pore structures, began revising the classical phylogenetic classification and to demonstrate parasitism between Jelly Fungi and other fungi. Bandoni collaborated with mycologists in Japan and other Asian countries. He was research fellow in 1983 at the University of Tsukuba and spent a sabbatical year at the University of Osaka. He wrote two field guides to Thailand mushrooms. Bandoni contributed to multiple publications on taxonomy in the Jelly Fungi up until his death.

In addition to scientific publications, Bandoni also contributed to several influential books. He contributed to Plant diversity: An evolutionary approach; a book written by the UBC Botany Faculty that "put the Botany Department onto the North American textbook bestseller list for almost a decade". He also contributed to the 570 page textbook Nonvascular plants: An evolutionary survey. In 1964 he co-authored with Adam Szczawinski a field guide titled Guide to common mushrooms of British Columbia.

Taxa described 

 Achroomyces abditus	(Bandoni) Hauerslev	1993
 Agaricostilbum hyphaenes	(Har. & Pat.) Oberw. & Bandoni	1982
 Aleurodiscus gigasporus	Ginns & Bandoni	1991
 Aleurodiscus subglobosporus	Ginns & Bandoni	1991
 Atractiella columbiana	Bandoni & Inderb.	2002
 Atractiella delectans	(Möller) Oberw. & Bandoni	1982
 Atractiella solani	(Cohn & J. Schröt.) Oberw. & Bandoni	1982
 Atractiellales	Oberw. & Bandoni	1982
 Atractogloea	Oberw. & Bandoni	1982
 Atractogloea stillata	Oberw. & Bandoni	1982
 Bullera aurantiaca	B.N. Johri & Bandoni	1984
 Bullera globispora	B.N. Johri & Bandoni	1984
 Bullera miyagiana	Nakase, Itoh, Takem. & Bandoni	1990
 Bullera salicina	B.N. Johri & Bandoni	1984
 Calacogloea	Oberw. & Bandoni	1991
 Calacogloea peniophorae	Oberw. & Bandoni	1991
 Carcinomyces	Oberw. & Bandoni	1982
 Carcinomyces effibulatus	(Ginns & Sunhede) Oberw. & Bandoni	1982
 Carcinomyces mycetophilus	(Peck) Oberw. & Bandoni	1982
 Carcinomycetaceae	Oberw. & Bandoni	1982
 Chionosphaera phylaciicola	(Seifert & Bandoni) R. Kirschner & Oberw.	2001
 Chionosphaeraceae	Oberw. & Bandoni	1982
 Christiansenia subgen. Carcinomyces	(Oberw. & Bandoni) F. Rath	1991
 Cladoconidium	Bandoni & Tubaki	1985
 Cladoconidium articulatum	Bandoni & Tubaki	1985
 Colacogloea	Oberw. & Bandoni	1991
 Colacogloea allantospora	Ginns & Bandoni	2002
 Colacogloea peniophorae	(Bourdot & Galzin) Oberw. & Bandoni	1991
 Cystofilobasidiaceae	K. Wells & Bandoni	2001
 Cystofilobasidium	Oberw. & Bandoni	1983
 Cystofilobasidium bisporidii	(Fell, I.L. Hunter & Tallman) Oberw. & Bandoni	1983
 Cystofilobasidium bisporidiis	(Fell, I.L. Hunter & Tallman) Oberw. & Bandoni	1983
 Cystofilobasidium capitatum	(Fell, I.L. Hunter & Tallman) Oberw. & Bandoni	1983
 Dacrymyces aquaticus	Bandoni & G.C. Hughes	1984
 Dioszegia aurantiaca	(B.N. Johri & Bandoni) M. Takash., T. Deák & Nakase	2001
 Entomocorticium	H.S. Whitney, Bandoni & Oberw.	1987
 Entomocorticium dendroctoni	H.S. Whitney, Bandoni & Oberw.	1987
 Exidiopsis paniculata	K. Wells & Bandoni	1987
 Exidiopsis punicea	K. Wells & Bandoni	1987
 Fibulobasidium	Bandoni	1979
 Fibulobasidium inconspicuum	Bandoni	1979
 Fibulobasidium sirobasidioides	Bandoni	1998
 Fibulostilbum phylacicola	Seifert & Bandoni	1992
 Fibulostilbum phylaciicola	Seifert & Bandoni	1992
 Filobasidium elegans	Bandoni & Oberw.	1991
 Filobasidium globisporum	Bandoni & Oberw.	1991
 Galzinia culmigena	(R.K. Webster & D.A. Reid) B.N. Johri & Bandoni	1975
 Helicobasidium corticioides	Bandoni	1955
 Herpobasidium australe	Oberw. & Bandoni	1984
 Ingoldiella nutans	Bandoni & Marvanová	1989
 Insolibasidium	Oberw. & Bandoni	1984
 Insolibasidium deformans	(C.J. Gould) Oberw. & Bandoni	1984
 Mycogloea amethystina	Bandoni	1998
 Mycogloea bullatospora	Bandoni	1998
 Mycogloea nipponica	Bandoni	1998
 Myxarium allantosporum	K. Wells & Bandoni	2004
 Naiadella	Marvanová & Bandoni	1987
 Naiadella fluitans	Marvanová & Bandoni	1987
 Platygloea abdita	Bandoni	1959
 Platygloea jacksonii	Bandoni & J.C. Krug	2000
 Pleotrachelus itersoniliae	(D.J.S. Barr & Bandoni) M.W. Dick	2001
 Pseudozyma	Bandoni emend. Boekhout	1985
 Pseudozyma prolifica	Bandoni	1985
 Ptechetelium	Oberw. & Bandoni	1984
 Ptechetelium cyatheae	(Syd.) Oberw. & Bandoni	1984
 Rozella itersoniliae	D.J.S. Barr & Bandoni	1980
 Sigmogloea	Bandoni & J.C. Krug	2000
 Sigmogloea tremelloidea	Bandoni & J.C. Krug	2000
 Sirotrema	Bandoni	1986
 Sirotrema parvula	Bandoni	1986
 Sirotrema pusilla	Bandoni	1986
 Sirotrema translucens	(H.D. Gordon) Bandoni	1986
 Sporobolomyces lactophilus	Nakase, Itoh, M. Suzuki & Bandoni	1990
 Sporobolomyces salicinus	(B.N. Johri & Bandoni) Nakase & Itoh	1988
 Stilbotulasnella	Oberw. & Bandoni	1982
 Stilbotulasnella conidiophora	Bandoni & Oberw.	1982
 Tetragoniomyces	Oberw. & Bandoni	1981
 Tetragoniomyces uliginosus	(P. Karst.) Oberw. & Bandoni	1981
 Tetragoniomycetaceae	Oberw. & Bandoni	1981
 Tilletiaria	Bandoni & B.N. Johri	1972
 Tilletiaria anomala	Bandoni & B.N. Johri	1972
 Tremella armeniaca	Bandoni & J. Carranza	1997
 Tremella aurantialba	Bandoni & M. Zang	1990
 Tremella guttaeformis	(Berk. & Broome) Bandoni	1961
 Tremella guttiformis	(Berk. & Broome) Bandoni	1961
 Tremella lilacea	Bandoni & J. Carranza	1997
 Tremella mesenterella	Bandoni & Ginns	1999
 Tremella nigrifacta	Bandoni & J. Carranza	1997
 Tremella phaeographidis	Diederich, Coppins & Bandoni	1996
 Tremella roseolutescens	Bandoni & J. Carranza	1997
 Tremella subencephala	Bandoni & Ginns	1993
 Tremellina	Bandoni	1986
 Tremellina pyrenophila	Bandoni	1986
 Trimorphomyces	Bandoni & Oberw.	1983
 Trimorphomyces papilionaceus	Oberw. & Bandoni	1983

Honors and memberships 
 Gertrude S. Burlingham Fellowship
 George Lawson Medal
 Mycological Society of Japan
 Mycological Society of America

Eponymous taxa 
 Bandonia
 Bandoniozyma

See also
List of mycologists

References 

Canadian mycologists
1926 births
2009 deaths
University of Nevada alumni
University of Iowa alumni
Academic staff of the University of British Columbia Faculty of Science